Kelliellidae is a family of bivalves belonging to the order Venerida.

Genera:
 Allopagus Stoliczka, 1871
 Alveinus Conrad, 1865
 Davidaschvilia Merklin, 1950
 Eocrassina Cossmann, 1913
 Kelliella Sars, 1870
 Pauliella Munier-Chalmas, 1895
 Zhgentiana Janssen, Janssen & van der Voort, 2015

References

Venerida
Bivalve families